Joe Thomas, New Man is the seventh album by American recording artist Joe, released on September 23, 2008 in the United States. It marked his debut on longtime collaborator Kedar Massenburg's independent record label Kedar Entertainment, following his split with Jive Records in 2007. The album debuted at number eight on the US Billboard 200 albums chart, and reached the top of the Independent Albums chart.

Target carried a special edition of Joe Thomas, New Man, including the songs "Triple Black Room", "I Will Again" and "Approach". These songs also appear on the UK edition of the album. The song "We Need to Roll", was set to feature Mario and Trey Songz. However, the pair did not appear on the standard edition of the album. Instead it was placed as a bonus track on the Japan edition of the album as a remix.

Background
In April 2007, following several delays, Joe released his sixth studio album Ain't Nothin' Like Me. It received generally positive reviews from music critics and debuted at number two on the US Billboard 200 and on top of the Top R&B/Hip Hop Albums chart, selling about 98,000 copies in its first week. The album marked his highest-charting album since My Name Is Joe (2000), which reached the same position of both charts. Soon after, Joe left longtime record company Jive Records to sign with Kedar Massenburg's independent record label Kedar Entertainment and resumed work on his seventh studio album. Set to have contributions from Nas, The Game, Busta Rhymes, Mario, Trey Songz, Snoop Dogg and P. Diddy, production on Joe Thomas, New Man was eventually helmed by Bryan-Michael Cox, Stereotypes, Mack Mckinney and D'Mile, among others.

Critical reception

Upon release, Joe Thomas, New Man received generally mixed to positive reviews from music critics. Thomas Inskeep from Allmusic gave the album three stars out of five and wrote that "on his seventh album, R&B crooner Joe keeps doing what he's always done best: sings sexy, woman-centric midtempo jams. There are no dramatic change-ups here – much as the likes of Barry White, Teddy Pendergrass, and Keith Sweat before him, Joe's not even trying to cross over to any audience other than adult black women [...]  The best thing about Joe Thomas, New Man is its consistency, which it's got in spades. Mark Edward Nero, writing for About.com, remarked that "And although his latest album is called Joe Thomas, New Man, this is for the most part the same singer whose music women have gone wild over for more than a decade. What's different though, is that Joe sounds rejuvenated on this album [...] To be honest, there's not a whole lot of new ground covered on the album, but Joe's the type of artist who doesn't need to reinvent himself to be or stay successful."

Commercial performance
Joe Thomas, New Man debuted at number eight on the US Billboard 200 albums chart on the week of September 29, 2008. 54,000 copies were sold in the first week. In addition, it also charted on top of Billboards Independent Albums chart, while reaching the top three on the Top R&B/Hip Hop Albums chart. In its second week on the charts, sales increased, with 112,725 copies sold. The first single, "E.R. (Emergency Room)" was released on July 15, 2008 and the second single, "Why Just Be Friends" was released on July 30.

Track listing

The Deluxe edition was released on November 25, 2008 and includes 3 new tracks in addition to the bonus snippets from Signature.

Charts

Weekly charts

Year-end charts

References

Joe (singer) albums
2008 albums
Albums produced by Bryan-Michael Cox